Sucker (stylized in all uppercase) is the second studio album by English singer Charli XCX, released on 15 December 2014 by Asylum and Atlantic Records. The album was met with positive reviews from critics, praising its throwback style, and ended up being included on many year-end lists for best albums of 2014. Sucker spawned the singles "Boom Clap", "Break the Rules", "Doing It" (featuring Rita Ora) and "Famous".

Charli promoted the album through a series of public appearances and televised live performances, as well as appearing on the Jingle Ball Tour 2014. The album was supported by Charli's Girl Power North America Tour, which lasted from September to October 2014. She was also the opening act for the European leg of Katy Perry's Prismatic World Tour in 2015.

Background
In 2013, Charli released her first major studio album, True Romance. The album received positive reviews by music critics, who praised its unique style. However, the album failed to chart on major markets. On 13 March 2014, she revealed to Complex that she had begun working on her second album with Weezer frontman Rivers Cuomo and Rostam Batmanglij of Vampire Weekend. Stargate duo and John Hill were also confirmed as producers. In an interview with DIY magazine, she stated that she wrote the record for girls and wants them to feel "a sense of empowerment". Charli explained in her tour diary with Replay Laserblast that the record's genre is still pop, but has "a very shouty, girl-power, girl-gang, Bow Wow Wow" feel to it at the same time. She also said in an interview with Idolator that Sucker would be influenced by the Hives, Weezer, the Ramones and 1960s yé-yé music.

On 7 January 2015, it was announced that the European release of the album would be pushed back yet again to 16 February 2015, featuring a revised track listing, including the new version of "Doing It" featuring Rita Ora, as well as the tracks "So Over You" and "Red Balloon".

Promotion

XCX's first high-profile performance of "Boom Clap" was at the 2014 MTV Video Music Awards pre-show on 24 August. She later sang "Boom Clap", followed by "Break the Rules", at the 2014 MTV Europe Music Awards, the American Music Awards of 2014, and on Saturday Night Live. In support of the album, Charli embarked on the Girl Power North America Tour in 2014. The tour kicked off in Orlando, Florida, on 26 September and concluded in San Francisco, California, on 25 October. She also performed the tracks from Sucker as part of her set for the Jingle Ball Tour 2014, and supported Katy Perry on European dates of her Prismatic World Tour in February and March 2015. Charli further promoted the album by embarking on an eight-date UK tour in 2015, which began in Brighton on 24 March and ended in Birmingham on 2 April.

Singles

"Boom Clap", the first single released from Sucker, was released worldwide on 17 June 2014. It was originally part of the soundtrack album for The Fault in Our Stars. The song was a commercial success, peaking at number six on the UK Singles Chart and number eight on the Billboard Hot 100. The song has since sold more than one million copies in the United States, receiving platinum certification by the Recording Industry Association of America, and has been certified silver by the British Phonographic Industry. There are two existing mixes of this song: the first and original one is heard on the film, the film's soundtrack, and the music video shot in Amsterdam; the second mix is heard on the music video shot in Japan and in this album.

"Break the Rules" was released as the second single from the album. The song and its accompanying music video were released on 25 August 2014. The song was moderately successful, reaching number four in Germany, number six in Austria, number 10 in Australia and the top 40 in Belgium, France, Norway and in Charli's native UK. Moreover, the song peaked at number 91 on the US Billboard Hot 100, her second consecutive entry on the chart.

"Doing It" was released on 3 February 2015 as the album's third single. The single version features English singer Rita Ora. Details of the collaboration first emerged when a setlist for BBC Radio 1 appeared on Twitter which featured the song. It peaked at number eight on the UK Singles Chart.

"Famous" was released on 29 May 2015 as the fourth and final single from the album. The music video was released on 23 March 2015.

Other songs
The tracks "London Queen" and "Gold Coins" premiered in advance of the album's release on 6 October and 17 November 2014, respectively. A music video for the song "Breaking Up" was released on 2 December 2014.

In November 2014, the album's European bonus track "Red Balloon" was used in a trailer for the 2015 animated film Home. The song was also included on the film's soundtrack, curated by Rihanna.

Critical reception

Sucker received generally positive reviews from music critics. At Metacritic, which assigns a normalised rating out of 100 to reviews from mainstream critics, Sucker received an average score of 75, based on 25 reviews. Will Hermes of Rolling Stone stated that "Sucker is no retro gesture: Charli runs the album's rock & roll guitars and attitude through enough distressed digital production and thumb type vernacular to make this the first fully updated iteration of punk pop in ages... Like so many of the pop pleasures here, it's a sentiment that just never gets old." Miles Raymer of Entertainment Weekly commented that "SUCKER is pop-punk, radically redefined and dragged, middle fingers waving, into the future." Brian Mansfield of USA Today wrote, "On Sucker, XCX doesn't just tweak the ear-candy pop template, she blows it up, then pries the shiniest bits from the asphalt. It's still sweet once she's finished sticking it back together, but it's got a bit of crunch, too." At AllMusic, Heather Phares opined that the album's "mix of youth and sophistication is more than a little volatile, and sometimes it feels like XCX is still figuring out what really works for her music... Nevertheless, it succeeds as an introduction to Charli XCX the Pop Star while retaining her whip-smart songwriting and attitude."

Dan Weiss of Spin expressed that "Sucker is just an exceptionally good pop album... Those are rare enough as it is." James Rainis of Slant Magazine viewed the album as "the sound of a long-incubating star emerging so fully formed on an international stage that it's difficult to figure that an artist gifted with so much sneering bravado was ever thought of as an underdog... Someone needed to author the aural equivalent of the body shot, and Charli XCX has provided the platonic ideal of just that: a party album charged equally with punkish rebellion, hip-hop cool, and pop universality." Jamieson Cox of Pitchfork felt that "Sucker isn't an endpoint for Charli [...] and it's not her finest work, but it's plenty good enough to rope a cohort of new fans into what's promising to be one hell of a creative ride." Jon Pareles, reviewing positively for The New York Times, emphasizes "Sucker is far more direct; it's smart, loud, cheeky, gimmick-loving pop, intent on making every song go bang... The ambition and calculation on Sucker are overt but not a deal-breaker. It's a brittle, professional album full of sonic treats."

Accolades
The album was named the best pop album of the year by Rolling Stone, who said, "Charli XCX is the pop star 2014 was waiting for: a badass songwriting savant who's the most fun girl in any room she steps into. The 22-year-old artist came into her own with Sucker, a middle-finger-waving teenage riot packed into 13 punky gems. It's a dance party, a mosh pit and a feminist rally – Charli's definitely in charge." Spin ranked it the sixth pop album of 2014, commenting that "Charli's second full-length shaves off the densely layered atmospherics and dreamy soundscapes." Meanwhile, Jason Lipshutz from Billboard listed Sucker as the second best pop album of 2014. NME listed Sucker as the 32nd best album of 2015.

Commercial performance
Sucker debuted at number 28 on the US Billboard 200 with first-week sales of 28,907 copies, making it Charli's first album to enter the chart. The album entered the UK Albums Chart at number 15, selling 5,622 copies in its first week. The album's UK sales as of May 2020 stood at 46,667 units.

Track listing

Notes
  signifies a co-producer
  signifies an additional producer
  signifies a remixer
  signifies a vocal producer
 US physical releases censor "fuck" in the title track with a bleep, while all other expletives in the song and the rest of the album are intact.
 The version of "Boom Clap" found in the album is the same from the Japanese music video and is different from the version heard in the original music video and in The Fault in Our Stars.

Personnel
Credits adapted from the liner notes of the European edition of Sucker.

Musicians

 Charli XCX – vocals
 Justin L. Raisen – drum programming, guitars ; backing vocals, synthesisers ; OP-1 
 Jerry James – drum programming ; bass ; backing vocals 
 Cashmere Cat – additional programming ; all instruments, programming 
 Chris Laws – drums 
 Steve Mac – keys 
 Dano "Robopop" Omelio – guitars 
 Steve Pearce – bass 
 Daniel Pursey – percussion 
 Macy McCutcheon – additional girl vocals 
 Bea Rexstrew – additional girl vocals 
 Kirstin Hume – additional girl vocals 
 Katie Littlewood – additional girl vocals 
 Shags Chamberlain – bass, backing vocals 
 Ariel Pink – synthesisers, mouth organ, backing vocals 
 Remi Nicole – additional vocals ; backing vocals 
 Patrik Berger – all instruments, programming ; backing vocals 
 John Hill – programming ; all instruments 
 Markus Krunegård – piano, additional vocals ; all instruments, programming, backing vocals 
 Noonie Bao – additional vocals 
 Matthew Eccles – drums 
 Keefus Ciancia – additional keys 
 Stefan Gräslund – additional programming 
 Rita Ora – featured vocals 
 Mr. Rogers – drums, bass, programming 
 Ariel Rechtshaid – programming 
 Christian Olsson – all instruments, programming 
 Greg Kurstin – guitar, bass, keys 
 Aaron Redfield – drums 
 Naughty Boy – instrumentation 
 Benny Blanco – instrumentation ; programming 
 Martin Stilling – all instruments, programming 
 Lars Skoglund – drums 
 Andrew Wyatt – backing vocals 
 Young & Sick – instrumentation, programming 
 Sarah Chernoff – backing vocals 
 Angel Deradoorian – backing vocals 
 Andrew Blakemore – backing vocals 
 Mikkel S. Eriksen – all instruments, programming 
 Tor Erik Hermansen – all instruments, programming

Technical

 Justin L. Raisen – production, engineering 
 Jerry James – production ; engineering 
 Rob Orton – mixing 
 Tony Lake – additional engineering 
 Caleb Laven – vocal editing 
 Steve Mac – production 
 Stargate – production 
 Cashmere Cat – production 
 Chris Laws – engineering 
 Daniel Pursey – engineering 
 Dave Schiffman – mixing 
 Patrik Berger – production ; engineering 
 John Hill – co-production ; production 
 Niek Meul – engineering 
 Chris Kasych – engineering 
 John Morrical – engineering 
 Martin Cooke – engineering 
 Martin Stilling – engineering assistance ; engineering 
 Stefan Gräslund – additional production ; production 
 Mark "Spike" Stent – mixing 
 Geoff Swan – mixing assistance 
 Ariel Rechtshaid – production 
 Mr. Rogers – production, engineering 
 Josh Gudwin – production, recording (Rita Ora's vocals) 
 Christian Olsson – production 
 Greg Kurstin – production, engineering 
 Alex Pasco – additional engineering 
 Julian Burg – additional engineering 
 Nick Rowe – vocal editing 
 Naughty Boy – production 
 Benny Blanco – production 
 Chris "Anger Management" Sclafani – engineering 
 Andrew "McMuffin" Luftman – production coordination 
 Seif "Mageef" Hussain – production coordination 
 Young & Sick – production 
 Rostam – production 
 Mikkel S. Eriksen – recording 
 Miles Walker – recording 
 Phil Tan – mixing 
 Daniela Rivera – additional engineering for mix 
 Stuart Hawkes – mastering
 Charli XCX – executive production

Artwork
 Frank Fieber – design, layout
 Harry Fieber – illustration
 Bella Howard – photography

Charts

Release history

References

2014 albums
Albums produced by Ariel Rechtshaid
Albums produced by Benny Blanco
Albums produced by Cashmere Cat
Albums produced by Greg Kurstin
Albums produced by John Hill (record producer)
Albums produced by Justin Raisen
Albums produced by Rostam Batmanglij
Albums produced by Stargate
Asylum Records albums
Atlantic Records albums
Charli XCX albums
Power pop albums by English artists
Pop punk albums by English artists